Hồ Minh Dĩ (born 17 February 1998) is a Vietnamese footballer who plays as a midfielder for V-League (Vietnam) club Hà Nội F.C.

Honours
Hà Nội
V.League 1: 2018, 2019; Runner-up: 2020  
Vietnamese National Cup: 2019, 2020
Vietnamese Super Cup: 2019, 2020, 2021 
Vietnam U19
AFF U-19 Youth Championship Third place : 2016
AFC U-19 Championship Third place : 2016

International career

International goals

U-19

External links

References 

1998 births
Living people
People from Quảng Trị province
Vietnamese footballers
Hoa people
Association football midfielders
V.League 1 players
Hanoi FC players